Kim Hee-jeong (born 1 January 1975) is a South Korean fencer. She competed in the épée events at the 1996 and 2004 Summer Olympics.

References

1975 births
Living people
South Korean female fencers
Olympic fencers of South Korea
Fencers at the 1996 Summer Olympics
Fencers at the 2004 Summer Olympics
Asian Games medalists in fencing
Fencers at the 2002 Asian Games
Asian Games gold medalists for South Korea
Medalists at the 2002 Asian Games
Universiade medalists in fencing
Universiade bronze medalists for South Korea
20th-century South Korean women
21st-century South Korean women